Tikhonovo is a rural locality (a village) in Goritskoye Rural Settlement, Kirillovsky District, Vologda Oblast, Russia. The population was 7, as of 2002.

Geography 
Tikhonovo is located 10 km southwest of Kirillov (the district's administrative centre) by road. Bakhlychevo is the nearest rural locality.

References 

Rural localities in Kirillovsky District